St. Cloud Heritage Museum is a history museum in downtown St. Cloud, Florida, Osceola County, Florida. It is housed in the Veterans Memorial Library building at 1012 Massachusetts Avenue.

The museum is operated by the Woman's Club of St. Cloud and the City of St. Cloud. The library was built by the Woman's Club in 1922 and named in honor of the American Civil War veterans who founded St. Cloud. It was designed by Ida Annah Ryan and Isabel Roberts, who formed the first all-female architectural firm in Orlando. The building was previously the town's library for more than 50 years before the City of St. Cloud Prichard it in 2001.

The museum was listed on the National Register of Historic Places on August 3, 2020 as the Veterans Memorial Library and Woman's Club of St. Cloud Auditorium.

References

External links

St Cloud Heritage Museum website

St. Cloud, Florida
Museums in Osceola County, Florida
History museums in Florida
Buildings and structures in Osceola County, Florida
Clubhouses on the National Register of Historic Places in Florida
National Register of Historic Places in Osceola County, Florida